"The Beginning of the Twist" is the first single from The Futureheads' third album This Is Not the World. It was released on 10 March 2008 in the United Kingdom and reached #20 on the UK Singles Chart and #1 on the UK Indie Chart. It was also featured on the soundtrack to the video game Pure.

The Beginning of the Twist is also played at the Stadium Of Light on Sunderland match days, as the players arrive on the pitch.

Track listing

CD
 "The Beginning of the Twist"
 "Get Out Today"

7" #1
 "The Beginning of the Twist"
 "Death of a King"

7" #2
 "The Beginning of the Twist"
 "Broke Up the Time"

The Futureheads songs
2008 singles
2007 songs
Songs written by Ross Millard